In classical algebraic geometry, a tacnode (also called a point of osculation or double cusp) is a kind of singular point of a curve. It is defined as a point where two (or more) osculating circles to the curve at that point are tangent. This means that two branches of the curve have ordinary tangency at the double point.

The canonical example is

A tacnode of an arbitrary curve may then be defined from this example, as a point of self-tangency locally diffeomorphic to the point at the origin of this curve. Another example of a tacnode is given by the links curve shown in the figure, with equation

More general background 
So  is a function from the plane to the line. The space of all such smooth functions is acted upon by the group of diffeomorphisms of the plane and the diffeomorphisms of the line, i.e. diffeomorphic changes of coordinate in both the source and the target. This action splits the whole function space up into equivalence classes, i.e. orbits of the group action.

One such family of equivalence classes is denoted by  where  is a non-negative integer. This notation was introduced by V. I. Arnold. A function  is said to be of type  if it lies in the orbit of  i.e. there exists a diffeomorphic change of coordinate in source and target which takes  into one of these forms. These simple forms  are said to give normal forms for the type -singularities.

A curve with equation  will have a tacnode, say at the origin, if and only if  has a type -singularity at the origin.

Notice that a node  corresponds to a type -singularity. A tacnode corresponds to a type -singularity. In fact each type -singularity, where  is an integer, corresponds to a curve with self-intersection. As  increases, the order of self-intersection increases: transverse crossing, ordinary tangency, etc.

The type -singularities are of no interest over the real numbers: they all give an isolated point. Over the complex numbers, type -singularities and type -singularities are equivalent:  gives the required diffeomorphism of the normal forms.

See also 
 Acnode
 Cusp or Spinode
 Crunode

References

External links 
 

Curves
Singularity theory
Algebraic curves